Robert Francis Catterson (March 22, 1835March 30, 1914) was a doctor, Union Army officer in the American Civil War, state legislator, militia officer, U.S. Marshal, and the 30th mayor of Little Rock, Arkansas (from 1871 to 1873). During the American Civil War, he was a senior officer of the Union Army and served as a brigade commander in the Army of the Tennessee.

Early life and education
Catterson was born on March 22, 1835, in Marion County, Indiana. He was educated at Adrian College in Michigan and Cincinnati Medical College in Ohio, precursor to the University of Cincinnati Academic Health Center. After completing his studies, Catterson established a medical practice in Rockville, Indiana.

American Civil War
When the American Civil War began in 1861, Catterson sided with the Union, gave up his medical practice, and volunteered to serve in the Union Army, enlisting in the 14th Indiana Infantry. On April 23 Catterson was mustered in as a private into Company A of the 14th, and on June 7 was promoted to first sergeant. Catterson was then elected as an officer and commissioned a second lieutenant on July 5. The following year he was promoted to first lieutenant on March 15, 1862.

In 1862 Catterson saw his first battle during the Valley Campaign, participating in the First Battle of Kernstown on March 23, and was promoted to captain on May 4. Catterson next fought during the Maryland Campaign and the Battle of Antietam on September 17, where he was wounded. Upon recovering, Catterson was appointed lieutenant colonel in the 97th Indiana Infantry on October 18, and its commander as colonel on November 25. Catterson and the 97th Indiana Infantry served the Battle of Memphis in Tennessee on June 6, 1862, and the subsequent occupation of the city, until late in 1862. He then took part in the Siege of Vicksburg in the spring of 1863 and the Tullahoma Campaign that summer. Catterson and his command participated in the Third Battle of Chattanooga on November 23–25, and the Atlanta Campaign throughout the summer of 1864.

During Major-General William T. Sherman's March to the Sea in the winter of 1864, Catterson was part of the Army of the Tennessee, heading a brigade in its XV Corps beginning on November 22, 1864. He fought in the Carolinas Campaign of 1865, participating in the Battle of Bentonville in North Carolina on March 19–21, the fight considered the last major engagement of the American Civil War. Also during the Carolinas Campaign, Catterson served very briefly as chief of staff to Major-General John A. Logan, the commander of the XV Corps. He then returned to his brigade, leading it for the rest of the campaign and to the end of the war. Catterson was brevetted to brigadier-general in the Union Army on May 31, 1865, and was mustered out of the volunteer service on January 15, 1866.

Later life
After the American Civil War, Catterson chose not to return to the practice of medicine; he moved to Arkansas, where he tried and failed at cotton speculation. He then became commander of the Arkansas's negro militia under Governor Powell Clayton, engaged in fighting against the Ku Klux Klan and defending freedmen, and also as a U.S. Marshal. During Clayton's successful political run for the U.S. Senate, Catterson was removed as marshal when he lost the favor of Clayton, and replaced by Isaac Mills. Catterson would later command Brooks's militia, during the Brooks–Baxter War (April – May 1874).

Catterson was the mayor of Little Rock, Arkansas, from 1872 to 1874. After serving as mayor, he moved to Minnesota, where he was unsuccessful as both a farmer and a farm implement merchant. He died at the age of 79 at the Veterans' Hospital in San Antonio, Texas, after suffering from a stroke. Catterson was buried in the San Antonio National Cemetery at Section A, Grave 176/177.

See also
List of Union Army generals

Notes

References

External links

 
 Robert Francis Catterson at The Political Graveyard
 

1835 births
1914 deaths
19th-century American politicians
Adrian College alumni
American militia generals
Arkansas Republicans
Brigadier generals
Burials in Texas
Mayors of Little Rock, Arkansas
People from Marion County, Indiana
People from San Antonio
People from Stearns County, Minnesota
People of the Brooks–Baxter War
People of Indiana in the American Civil War
People of the Reconstruction Era
Tax collectors
Union Army generals
United States Marshals